Gottlob Hengombe Mbaukua (born 1935) was the Chairman of the Executive Committee of Hereroland from August 1987 to October 1987 and from February 1988 to May 1989. In this position he was the highest representative of his bantustan to the South African apartheid administration in South-West Africa. The Executive Committees were abolished in May 1989 as part of the transition to Namibian independence which was declared in March 1990.

References

1935 births
Namibian politicians
Herero people
Living people